Davon Lamar Wilson (born September 28, 1990), better known as Jasper Dolphin (or simply Jasper), is an American actor, stunt performer and former rapper. He is best known for being a founding member of American hip hop collective Odd Future, but has since ventured further into his career in acting. He starred in Jasper & Errol's First Time on Viceland in 2019, and was featured as a new member of Jackass on Jackass Forever (2022).

Career

2007–2010: Formation of Odd Future 
Jasper Dolphin was a founding member of the Los Angeles hip hop collective Odd Future, founded in 2007. In 2008, Jasper formed the Odd Future sub-group, I Smell Panties, with fellow Odd Future member and leader, Tyler, the Creator. They released their debut project, I Smell Panties EP, on June 28, 2008. Jasper rapped on "Lisa" off Odd Future's debut mixtape, The Odd Future Tape, released in November 2008.

Jasper was featured on the track "Tina", off Tyler, The Creator's debut mixtape, Bastard, released on December 25, 2009. It also featured Odd Future member, Taco. Jasper rapped on "Double Cheeseburger", "Round and Round", and "Swag Me Out" off Odd Future's second mixtape, Radical, released on May 7, 2010. Jasper was also featured on the track "Deaddeputy" off MellowHype's debut studio album, BlackenedWhite, released on October 31, 2010.

2011–2014: Odd Future rise and early acting career 
Jasper was featured on the track "Bitch Suck Dick" off Tyler, The Creator's debut studio album, Goblin, released May 10, 2011. On June 19, 2011, the track "Thisniggaaintfunnyatall", by Tyler, The Creator featuring Jasper Dolphin and Taco, was leaked. On September 8, 2011, it was announced that Odd Future would be making a television show called Loiter Squad. The show was announced to be a sketch comedy show featuring various skits and pranks that originally aired on March 25, 2012, on Adult Swim. The show features Jasper, along with Odd Future members Tyler, The Creator, Taco, L-Boy, and Earl Sweatshirt as main cast members with other members of Odd Future making cameo appearances. The program is produced by Dickhouse Productions. which also is the production company for Jackass. Jasper rapped on the tracks "We Got Bitches" and "Oldie" off Odd Future's debut studio album, The OF Tape Vol. 2.

Jasper was featured on the track "Trashwang" off Tyler, The Creator's second studio album, Wolf. It also featured Na'kel, Lucas, L-Boy, Taco, Left Brain and Lee Spielman of Trash Talk. Jasper continued to be a regular cast member of Loiter Squad in Season 2, premiered on March 10, 2013, and Season 3, premiered May 15, 2014. Jasper, credited as Demonté, was featured on Tyler, The Creator gangster rap alter-ego's, Young Nigga's, song "I Just Bought a Bugatti (I'm Happy)", released on June 6, 2014. It also featured IceJJFish.

2017–present: Focus on acting career 
In 2017, GOLF Media announced a show on their now-deleted app with Jasper as the lead role, titled "Quality Time with Jasper". Viewers have compared the show to The Eric Andre Show.

In 2019, it was announced Jasper was having a show with an Odd Future friend, Errol Chatham on the channel Viceland. The show focuses on the two having their first time doing activities that they have never done before. They both also appeared in one episode of Ridiculousness in 2019.

In 2021, it was announced that Jasper along with 4 other people will be the new cast members in Jackass Forever (2022). Jasper's dad Compston "Dark Shark" Wilson, and fellow Odd Future members Tyler, the Creator, Errol Chatham, Lionel Boyce, Syd, and Travis "Taco" Bennett also appeared in this movie. Jasper also appeared in the Jackass Shark Week special with Johnny Knoxville, Steve-O, Chris Pontius, and Sean "Poopies" McInerney, who is also a new cast member in Jackass Forever. Jasper made a guest appearance in the YouTube web series titled Truth or Dab in the episode starring fellow Jackass Forever cast members Wee Man and Steve-O. He made a guest appearance in WWE SmackDown with fellow Jackass members Knoxville, Pontius, Dave England, new member Zach Holmes, and director Jeff Tremaine. He helped Knoxville beat Sami Zayn in WrestleMania 38.

Discography

with Odd Future 

 Studio albums
 The OF Tape Vol. 2 (2012)

 Mixtapes
 The Odd Future Tape (2008)
 Radical (2010)

with Tyler, the Creator, as I Smell Panties 

 Extended plays
 I Smell Panties (2008)

Guest appearances

Filmography

Television

Films

Web series

References

External links 

1990 births
Living people
African-American male comedians
American male comedians
African-American rappers
American rappers
American stunt performers
American television actors
American television writers
Jackass (TV series)
Odd Future members
Rappers from Los Angeles
21st-century American comedians
21st-century American rappers